The 1990–91 Asian Cup Winners' Cup was the first edition of Asian Cup Winners' Cup, the continental football competition for cup winners of member nations of the AFC. Persepolis of Iran were duly crowned champions after defeating Muharraq of Bahrain 1–0 over two legs in the final.

Seventeen clubs entered the competition, but a number of clubs withdrew before games took place.

First round

|}
1 Al Qadisiya withdrew. 
2 Renown SC withdrew.

Second round

|}
1 Daewoo Royals withdrew. 
2 Both Krama Yudha Tiga Berlian and Dalian withdrew; the tie was scratched.

Third round

|}

Final

|}

First game

Second game

References

Asian Cup Winners Cup 1991

Asian Cup Winners' Cup
2
2
Persepolis F.C. matches